The Zhejiang Football Super League (ZSL) is a league of football teams from Zhejiang Province, China, which was formed in 2003. The league sits at level 6–7 on the pyramid system. There are 8 teams in 2 divisions separately. It is a feeder to the CMCL.

The league organised by the Zhejiang Football Association, is the top league of Zhejiang Province.

Format 
The ZSL is divided into 2 divisions of 8 teams each, starting from season 2020.

Teams in Division A play each other twice in the league (home and away), receiving three points for a win and one point for a draw. No points are awarded for a loss. At the end of each season, the club with the most points is crowned ZSL Division A champions. There is no established format for the Division B, and the tournament system is temporarily used for season 2020 and 2021.

Promotion and relegation

CMCL / Division A 
The champions of Division A may qualify for the CMCL.

Division A / Division B 
The champions of Division B are directly promoted to the Division A, swapping places with the bottom club of Division A. The club finishing 2nd in Division B, and the 7th placed team in Division A then enter the play-off to decide a place in next season.

Division B / lower-level leagues 
Promotion places will only be awarded if a team withdraws from the Division B.

The other teams in the qualifying round come from the winning teams in the lower-level leagues (or recommended by lower-level FA), which are:

 Hangzhou FA Super League
Huzhou Super League
Lishui 9-a-side Clubs League
Ningbo Super League
Wenzhou Amateur Super League
Zhoushan League One

History

Zhejiang Football Cities Championships League 
Created in 2003, Zhejiang Football Cities Championships League (ZCCL) is the first province-level association football league in Zhejiang, and its predecessor was the Zhejiang Football Association Cup (founded in the 1980s). The first season gathered 5 teams to participate, playing each other 2 ties, with Ningbo Xinyongjiang winning the first title. Because ZCCL had become an affiliated league to the Chinese Football Association Bing League by the time, the winning team qualified for that season's China Football Amateur League, but Hangzhou Sinobal took the entry instead of Ningbo Xinyongjiang.

After 13 years of development, by season 2015, the ZCCL had expanded to 14 member teams.

Name changing 
In season 2006, the league changed its name to Zhejiang Football Super League. The first season under current name, 11 teams gained entry, and Ningbo Yinbo won the championship. In season 2020, the league extended to 16 teams and split into 2 divisions.

Member clubs 
The clubs listed below have competed in the ZSL/ZCCL since it was created in 2003. Clubs currently playing in the league are shown in bold.

List of championships

References 

Football leagues in China
Sports leagues in China
2003 establishments in China
Sports leagues established in 2003